The second incarnation of Hewlett-Packard, Inc. is an American multinational information technology company headquartered in Palo Alto, California, that develops personal computers (PCs), printers and related supplies, as well as 3D printing solutions.

It was formed on November 1, 2015, a spinoff of the original Hewlett-Packard Company due to a bad partnership and merger with the company Autonomy, with that company's enterprise product and business services divisions becoming Hewlett Packard Enterprise. The second spin off, Hewlett Packard Enterprise is a different publicly traded company. HP Inc. retains Hewlett-Packard's pre-2015 stock price history and its former stock ticker symbol, HPQ, while Hewlett Packard Enterprise trades under its own symbol, HPE.

HP is listed on the New York Stock Exchange and is a constituent of the S&P 500 Index. It is the world's 2nd largest personal computer vendor by unit sales as of January 2021, after Lenovo. In the 2018 Fortune 500 list, HP is ranked 58th largest United States corporation by total revenue.

History 

HP Inc. is the acronym for the original incarnation, Hewlett-Packard. Hewlett-Packard was founded in 1939 by Bill Hewlett and David Packard, who both graduated with degrees in electrical engineering from Stanford University in 1935. The company started off in the HP Garage in Palo Alto, California. On November 1, 2015, the company's enterprise business was spun off and renamed Hewlett Packard Enterprise.

As HP Inc. 
In May 2016, HP introduced a new PC gaming sub-brand known as Omen (reusing trademarks associated with VoodooPC), including gaming laptops and desktops (with the latter offering options such as CPU water cooling and Nvidia's GTX 1080 graphics, and promoted as VR-ready), and other accessories (such as monitors) designed to cater to the market.

In November 2017, HP acquired Samsung Electronics' printer division for $1.05 billion.

In February 2021, HP announced its acquisition of Kingston's gaming division HyperX for $425 million. The deal only includes computer peripherals branded as HyperX, not memory or storage.
The sale was completed in June 2021.

In February 2022, HP announced it had acquired the Edinburgh-based packaging development company, Choose Packaging, in an effort to strengthen its capabilities in the sustainable packaging vertical.

In March 2022, HP announced the acquisition of the California-headquartered communications software and hardware provider Poly Inc. in an all-cash transaction. HP said the cash amount agreed was $40 per share, which implied a total enterprise value of $3.3bn, inclusive Poly's net debts.

Attempted merger with Xerox 
On November 5, 2019, The Wall Street Journal reported that print and digital document company Xerox was contemplating acquiring HP. The company unanimously rejected two unsolicited offers, including a cash-and-stock offer at $22 per-share. HP stated that there was "uncertainty regarding Xerox’s ability to raise the cash portion of the proposed consideration" (especially given that Xerox is a smaller company in terms of market cap than HP), and noted the company's aggressiveness. On November 26, 2019, Xerox issued a public letter defending allegations by HP that its offer was "uncertain" and "highly conditional", and declared its intent to "engage directly with HP shareholders to solicit their support in urging the HP Board to do the right thing and pursue this compelling opportunity."

Xerox stated in January 2020 that it would propose the replacement of HP's board of directors during its next shareholder meeting in April 2020. In a statement to TechCrunch, HP disclosed a belief that Xerox's bid was being "driven by" activist shareholder Carl Icahn. Xerox raised its bid to $24 per-share in February 2020.

On February 21, 2020, HP instituted a shareholder rights plan to fend off Xerox's pursuit of a hostile takeover. Four days later, HP announced that, if shareholders rejected the Xerox purchase, it planned on offering $16 billion in capital return between fiscal 2020 and 2022, including $8 billion in additional share buybacks and raising its "target long-term return of capital to 100% of free cash flow generation". HP criticized Xerox's bid as a "flawed value exchange" based on "overstated synergies". On March 5, 2020, HP rejected an offer at $24 per-share.

On March 31, 2020, Xerox rescinded its bid to buy HP Inc, issuing in a statement, "The current global health crisis and resulting macroeconomic and market turmoil caused by COVID-19 have created an environment that is not conducive to Xerox continuing to pursue an acquisition of HP Inc."

Current operations 
HP develops personal computers (PCs), printers and related supplies, as well as 3D Printing solutions.

In fiscal year 2022, total revenue of  included US$29.2 billion from the sale of notebook computers, US$10.7 billion from the sale of desktop computers, US$11.8 billion from the sale of printer supplies, US$4.2 billion from the sale of commercial printers, and US$2.9 billion from the sale of consumer printers. Over 65 percent of revenue in 2022 came from customers outside of the United States.

Audio partner 
In March 2015, HP announced that Bang & Olufsen would become the company's new premium audio partner for its computers and other devices. The partnership replaced the one with Beats Electronics which ended upon its acquisition by Apple Inc.

Controversies

Xinjiang region 

In 2020, the Australian Strategic Policy Institute accused at least 82 major brands, including HP Inc, of being connected to forced Uyghur labor in the Chinese Xinjiang province.

Carbon footprint 
HP reported Total CO2e emissions (Direct + Indirect) for the twelve months ending December 31, 2020, at 254 Kt (−34 /-11.8% y-o-y) and plans to reduce emissions 60% by 2025 from a 2015 base year. This science-based target is aligned with Paris Agreement to limit global warming to 1.5 °C above pre-industrial levels.

According to a press release issued on April 20, 2021, HP seeks to achieve net zero greenhouse gas emissions across the HP value chain by 2040, beginning with their Supplies business achieving carbon neutrality by 2030. "Climate change is a defining challenge of our generation that demands immediate action and investment," said Enrique Lores, HP Inc. President and CEO. "Now is a time for bold moves and ambitious goals that will protect our planet and create new sources of innovation and growth across the global economy. By driving toward net-zero carbon emissions across our entire value chain by 2040, product circularity and a forest positive framework, we will accelerate our progress and advance HP’s aspiration to become the world’s most sustainable and just technology company."

See also 

 HP Labs
 List of largest technology companies by revenue

References

External links 
 

2015 establishments in California
American brands
American companies established in 2015
Companies based in Palo Alto, California
Companies listed on the New York Stock Exchange
Computer companies of the United States
Consumer electronics brands
Display technology companies
Manufacturing companies based in the San Francisco Bay Area
Multinational companies headquartered in the United States
Netbook manufacturers
Manufacturing companies established in 2015
Computer companies established in 2015
Corporate spin-offs
Software companies based in California
Software companies of the United States
Technology companies based in the San Francisco Bay Area
Technology companies established in 2015
Technology companies of the United States